Illinois Route 18 (IL 18) is a rural east–west state route in central Illinois. It runs east from the town of Henry at Illinois Route 29 to the town of Blackstone at Illinois Route 17.

Route description 

Illinois 18 crosses the Illinois River at Henry, and is the first river crossing south of Interstate 180. The terrain is generally flat outside of the Illinois River Valley area. In Streator, Illinois 18 westbound becomes Main Street. Eastbound, it becomes Bridge Street. Illinois 18 is also known as North 13th Road and East 24th Road in LaSalle County.

History 
From 1918 through 1935, SBI Route 18 ran from Chicago to Princeton using what used to be part of U.S. Route 32. Since then, IL 18 as well as part of US 32 were superseded by US 34. In 1939, it was applied to what was then SBI Routes 89B and 89C as well as part of SBI Route 17. The next year, the route was completed and Illinois 17 moved to a new highway south of Streator.

Major intersections

References

External links

 Illinois Highway Ends: Illinois Route 18

018
U.S. Route 34
Transportation in Stark County, Illinois
Transportation in Marshall County, Illinois
Transportation in Putnam County, Illinois
Transportation in LaSalle County, Illinois
Transportation in Livingston County, Illinois